Tzur Yitzhak (lit. Rock of Yitzhak) is a community settlement in central Israel. Located near Tzur Natan and Kokhav Ya'ir, it falls under the jurisdiction of Drom HaSharon Regional Council.

History
The village was founded in June 2007 and named in memory of 
former Prime Minister Yitzhak Rabin. It initially consisted of around 140 residential units in two different projects. There are plans for a total of around 2,650 dwellings in the settlement Its proximity to Highway 6 (Israel) and attractive real estate prices assisted in its rapid growth.

On 8 September 2012 Tzur Yitzhak was officially recognized as an independent locality with its own council, composed of 12 members.

References

Community settlements
Populated places established in 2007
Populated places in Central District (Israel)
2007 establishments in Israel